Pa Ab-e Shelal (also Romanized as Pā Āb-e Shelāl; also known as Shalāl) is a village in Shalal and Dasht-e Gol Rural District, in the Central District of Andika County, Khuzestan Province, Iran. At the 2006 census, its population was 308, in 62 families.

References 

Populated places in Andika County